Dolen Perkins-Valdez is an American writer, best known for her debut novel Wench: A Novel (2010), which became a bestseller.

She is Chair of the Board of the PEN/Faulkner Foundation Board of Directors.

Early life and education
She attended Harvard College as an undergraduate, earning a BA degree. She completed a PhD in English at George Washington University in Washington, DC.

Career
Perkins-Valdez has published short fiction and essays in such magazines as The Kenyon Review, StoryQuarterly, StorySouth, African American Review, PMS: PoemMemoirStory, North Carolina Literary Review, Richard Wright Newsletter, and SLI: Studies in Literary Imagination.

She is currently an Associate Professor at American University in Washington, DC.

Perkins-Valdez has said she was inspired to write her debut novel, Wench: A Novel (2010), after reading a biography of W.E.B. Dubois and coming across a brief reference to the founding of Wilberforce University. It was noted as first being based at the buildings and grounds of a former, privately owned resort called Tawawa House, named for the "yellow springs" in the area. The iron-rich waters were thought to have medicinal value. Among the regular summer visitors to the Ohio resort in the antebellum period were Southern white planters and their enslaved mistresses of color.

Wench features Lizzie, a young enslaved woman, and her complicated relationship with her master. It also explores the lives of three other mistresses of color, whom Lizzie comes to know at the resort. They are influenced by spending time in a free state, and seeing free people of color there. It was published by HarperCollins in 2010 and in paperback the following year.

The book received positive reviews and notice as a debut novel. The paperback edition became a bestseller. The novel was selected by NPR in 2010 as one of five books published that year that was recommended to book clubs, for "something to talk about".

Other works
In 2013, Perkins-Valdez was invited to write an introductory essay to the 37th edition of Solomon Northup's autobiography Twelve Years a Slave.

Her second novel, Balm: A Novel, was published in May 2015. The novel is set in Chicago during the Reconstruction Era. It explores a Tennessee black healer named Madge, who was born free; a white widowed spiritualist named Sadie; and a freedman called Hemp from Kentucky, who gained freedom by fighting with the Union Army. Each migrated to Chicago after the war, along with thousands of others working to rebuild their lives and to explore new kinds of freedom.

Perkins-Valdez said that she wanted to "move the story out of the battlegrounds of the war into a place like Chicago [...] taking it out of those traditional spaces such as the South or even thinking of Virginia or Pennsylvania... and putting it somewhere that was absolutely affected by the war but was still, in some ways, peripheral."

Dolen's third novel Take My Hand will be published by Berkley Books/Penguin Random House in Spring 2022.

Honors
 2002-2003, she was a president's postdoctoral fellow at the Center for African American Studies at the University of California at Los Angeles.
 2009, finalist for the Robert Olen Butler Fiction Award.
 2011, finalist for two NAACP Image Awards and the Hurston-Wright Legacy Award for fiction, for her novel Wench
 Perkins-Valdez received the First Novelist Award in 2011 for Wench by the Black Caucus of the American Library Association.
 She received a DC Commission on the Arts Grant to aid in completion of her second novel, Balm.

Bibliography
Wench: A Novel (2010) 
Balm: A Novel (2015) 
Take My Hand (2022)

References

External links

 

21st-century American women writers
Living people
African-American novelists
American women novelists
American historical novelists
Year of birth missing (living people)
21st-century American novelists
Women historical novelists
Harvard University alumni
Columbian College of Arts and Sciences alumni
Writers from Memphis, Tennessee
Novelists from Tennessee
University of Memphis alumni
University of Mary Washington faculty
University of Puget Sound faculty
American University faculty and staff